KXPM-LP (100.3 FM) is a low-power broadcast radio station licensed to Perham, Minnesota.

The station receives part of its programming from Relevant Radio with local inserts and announcements.

References

External links

Otter Tail County, Minnesota
Low-power FM radio stations in Minnesota
Radio stations established in 2016
2016 establishments in Minnesota
Christian radio stations in Minnesota
Relevant Radio stations
Catholic Church in Minnesota